Qualls may refer to:

Places
United States
Qualls, Oklahoma, a small community in Cherokee County, Oklahoma
Fort Qualls, near Crawford, Texas

People
Ashley Qualls (born 1990), American entrepreneur
Chad Qualls (born 1978), American baseball pitcher
DJ Qualls (born 1978), American actor and comedian
Elijah Qualls (born 1995), American football player
Henry Qualls (1934–2003), American Texas and country blues guitarist and singer
Jim Qualls (born 1946), American baseball outfielder
Michael Qualls (born  1994), American basketball player for Hapoel Gilboa Galil of the Israeli Basketball Premier League
Roxanne Qualls (born 1953), mayor of Cincinnati, Ohio from 1993 to 1999

See also
Dave Quall (1936–2020), American politician from the state of Washington

English-language surnames
Disambiguation pages with surname-holder lists